Alexander Hird (2 September 1900 – 1988) was a Scottish footballer who played in the Football League for Charlton Athletic and South Shields.

References

1900 births
1988 deaths
Scottish footballers
Association football midfielders
English Football League players
Montrose F.C. players
Dundee F.C. players
Gateshead A.F.C. players
Charlton Athletic F.C. players